Temnora engis is a moth of the family Sphingidae. It is known from Madagascar.

It is similar to Temnora murina, but the forewing upperside lacks the subapical dark spot on the outer margin, instead there is a small rounded spot set some way back from the outer margin. Also, the inner edge of the dark marginal band on the hindwing upperside is more diffuse.

Subspecies
Temnora engis engis
Temnora engis catalai Griveaud, 1959

References

Temnora
Moths described in 1933
Moths of Madagascar
Moths of Africa